The Mother and the Whore is a 1973 French film directed by Jean Eustache and starring Jean-Pierre Léaud, Bernadette Lafont and Françoise Lebrun. An examination of the relationships between three characters in a love triangle, it was Eustache's first feature film and is considered his masterpiece. Eustache wrote the screenplay drawing inspiration from his own relationships, and shot the film from May to July 1972.

The film screened at the 1973 Cannes Film Festival, where it won the Grand Prix. With some divided initial critical reaction, it has been championed by later critics and filmmakers.

Plot
In Paris, Alexandre, an unemployed young man with memories of the May 1968 events in France, attempts to persuade his former love, Gilberte, to marry him. Gilberte opts to instead marry another man. Alexandre is involved with a live-in girlfriend called Marie, and is interested in films such as The Working Class Goes to Heaven. One day, after an unsuccessful reconciliation with Gilberte at the highly popular Les Deux Magots café, he meets Veronika, a Polish French twenty-something nurse. In the midst of the sexual revolution, Veronika is highly promiscuous, and begins to make advances on Alexandre.

During the summer of 1972, Alexandre and Marie are nude in bed in their apartment when Veronika visits. Marie lets her in and Veronika insults both of them, but acknowledges she is not pure herself. The three begin a ménage à trois and sleep in the same bed, with Veronika assuring Alexandre she and Marie both love him, and telling him to be more happy with his situation and life. Although Marie affirms her indifference to Alexandre's affairs, she quickly changes her mind when she sees how close he becomes to Veronika. This leads to a growing estrangement between her and Alexandre. As the three sit together, Veronika attempts to reassure Marie about her looks and body. Tearfully, Veronika speaks about how she believes no women are truly whores, and how love is meaningless unless it produces a child.

Cast

 Bernadette Lafont as Marie
 Jean-Pierre Léaud as Alexandre
 Françoise Lebrun as Veronika
 Isabelle Weingarten as Gilberte
 Jacques Renard as Alexandre's friend
 Jean-Noël Picq as Offenbach's lover
 Geneviève Mnich as Veronika's friend
 Caroline Loeb
 André Téchiné
 Jean-Claude Biette
 Pierre Cottrell
 Jean Douchet
 Douchka
 Bernard Eisenschitz
 Noël Simsolo
 Berthe Granval
 Jean Eustache as the man at the supermarket

Production
In 1972 Eustache had begun to doubt his career in films and contemplated quitting the business. He told a reporter from Le Nouvel Observateur "If I knew what it was that I wanted, I wouldn't wake up in the morning to make films. I'd do nothing, I'd try to live without doing or producing anything." Soon afterwards he got a new idea for a film to make with his friends Jean-Pierre Léaud and Bernadette Lafont; he also brought in his ex-lover Françoise Lebrun who at that time was a literature student and had never acted before. Eustache was loaned money from friend Barbet Schroeder to spend three months writing the script, which was over three hundred pages. Although the film often seems to be highly improvised, every word of dialogue was written by Eustache. The film was very autobiographical and was inspired by Eustache's various relationships, such as his then recent breakup with Françoise Lebrun and romantic relationships with Marinka Matuszewsk and Catherine Garnier. Many of the locations used in the film were places that Garnier had lived or worked. The character played by Jacques Renard was based on Eustache's friend Jean-Jacques Schuhl.

The film was shot between May 21 and July 11, 1972. on a budget of 700,000 francs. Eustache called it a very hostile film, and it mostly consisted of dialogues and monologues about sex. Eustache says that the character Alexandre is "destroying [the three lead characters], but he is looking for it all along. After his voyage into madness and depression, he ends up alone. That's when I stop the film." Filming locations included Les Deux Magots Café, the Café de Flore, the Café le Saint-Claude, the Laennec Hospital, the Blue Train restaurant and inside various apartments on the Rue de Vaugirard and Rue Vavin. The film had no musical score and only used natural sounds and occasionally music played by the characters on phonographs, such as Wolfgang Amadeus Mozart, Edith Piaf, Marlene Dietrich and Deep Purple.

Eustache described the film as a "narrative of certain seemingly innocuous acts. It could be the narrative of entirely different acts, in other places. What happens, the places where the action unfolds, have no importance...My subject is the way in which important actions situate themselves in a continuum of innocuous ones. It's the description of the normal course of events without the schematic abbreviation of cinematographic dramatization."

Luc Béraud is assistant director on the movie.

Reception
The Mother and the Whore is considered Eustache's masterpiece, and was called the best film of the 1970s by Cahiers du cinéma. It won the Grand Prix of the Jury and the FIPRESCI prize at the 1973 Cannes Film Festival. The film created a scandal at the Cannes Film Festival, as many critics saw the film as immoral and obscene or, in the words of the broadsheet Le Figaro, "an insult to the nation", while Télé-7-Jours called it a "monument of boredom and a Himalaya of pretension". On its initial run the film sold over 343,000 tickets in France.

After gaining little public recognition despite receiving praise throughout the years from critics and directors, such as François Truffaut and other members of the French New Wave, Eustache became an overnight success and internationally famous after the film's Cannes premiere. He soon financed his next film. The critic Dan Yakir said that the film was "a rare instance in French cinema where the battle of the sexes is portrayed not from the male point of view alone". James Monaco called it, "one of the most significant French films of the 1970s". Jean-Louise Berthomé said, "I am not sure that La maman et la putain, with its romances of a poor young man of 1972, doesn't say something new." Pauline Kael praised the film, saying it reminded her of John Cassavetes in its ability "to put raw truth on the screen – including the boring and the trivial". Jean-Louis Bory of Le Nouvel Observateur gave the film a negative review, calling it misogynistic and criticizing the characterization of Alexandre.

Legacy
The film's reputation has increased over time. In 1982, the literary magazine Les Nouvelles littéraires celebrated the tenth anniversary of the film by publishing a series of articles about it.

It has been called one of the best films in French history by Jean-Michel Frodon and Jean-Henri Roger. Film director Olivier Assayas has especially praised the film and considers it an example of what to strive for in filmmaking. It was ranked the second greatest French film of all time by a poll of filmmakers.

Andrew Johnston, writing in Time Out New York, described his experience of viewing the film: 

After a 2016 retrospective screening at the French Institute Alliance Française, film critic Richard Brody effusively praised Eustache's sophisticated portrayal of characters whose "intimate disasters have the feel of epic clashes." Further, he sees the film as Eustache's "comprehensive vision" of radical politics and the Sexual Revolution in post-1968 France – a stark, regretful, and suspicious vision that Brody terms "ferociously conservative".

The film was adapted into a 1990 stage play by Jean-Louis Martinelli. In 1996, the French rock band Diabologum utilized Veronika's monologue in a song named The Mom and the Whore on their album #3. Vincent Dieutre's 2008 film ea2, 2e exercice d'admiration: Jean Eustache paid tribute to Veronika's monologue.

References

External links

1973 romantic drama films
1973 films
1973 directorial debut films
Films about sexuality
Films directed by Jean Eustache
Films set in Paris
Films shot in Paris
1970s French-language films
French romantic drama films
Sexual revolution
Films produced by Bob Rafelson
Cannes Grand Prix winners
1970s French films